is a Japanese footballer. He is a forward, who plays for Criacao Shinjuku from 2023.

Personal life 
He was educated at and played for Shimizu Commercial High School & Juntendo University before moving to Singapore after his graduation in 2017.

Club career

Albirex Niigata Singapore 
Tsubasa signed his first professional contract with Albirex Niigata Singapore FC, a satellite team of J.League side Albirex Niigata, playing in the top tier of football in Singapore, the S.League.

He made his competitive debut in the 2017 Singapore Community Shield, which doubled up as the first league game of the season, against Tampines Rovers FC. Although he missed glaring chances in the game, he managed to win his first piece of silverware as the White Swans came out 2-1 winners in an ill-tempered match.

He scored his first goals for the club in a 5-0 demolition of the Garena Young Lions in match day 2 of the 2017 S.League season, bringing his tally to 2 goals in 2 games. He scored another brace in a 2-0 win over Hougang United FC, bringing his tally for the season to 5 goals in 5 games and helping his team to the top of the table. Tsubasa scored his 7th and 8th goals in the next match, helping Albirex to the top of the table and condemning Warriors FC to their first defeat of the season.

It proved to be a good season for Sano and the White Swans as the Japanese satellite club swept all four pieces of silverware on offer in Singapore for a second consecutive year. Sano proved to be very influential, scoring 26 league goals to finish as the 2017 S.League top scorer as well as scoring a goal in the 2017 Singapore Cup final to help Albirex secure their fourth piece of silverware of 2017. In total, he had 31 goals in all competitions.

Roasso Kumamoto 
After his breakthrough season in the S.League, Sano secured a move to J2 League side Roasso Kumamoto.

Nagano Parceiro 
In 2020, Sano officially joined J3 club Nagano Parceiro. He left the club in the end of the 2022 season, after two seasons at the club.

Criacao Shinjuku 
In 2023, Sano officially joined to JFL club Criacao Shinjuku.

Club career statistics
As of the end of the 2022 season.

Honours

Club 
Albirex Niigata Singapore
 S.League: 2017
 Singapore Cup: 2017
 Singapore League Cup: 2017
 Singapore Community Shield: 2017

Individual 
 S.League Top Scorer: 2017

References

External links

Profile at Roasso Kumamoto

1994 births
Living people
Japanese footballers
Singapore Premier League players
Albirex Niigata Singapore FC players
J2 League players
J3 League players
Japan Football League players
Roasso Kumamoto players
AC Nagano Parceiro players
Criacao Shinjuku players
Association football forwards